For the state pageant affiliated with Miss Teen USA, see Miss Maryland Teen USA

The Miss Maryland's Outstanding Teen competition is the pageant that selects the representative for the U.S. state of Maryland in the Miss America's Outstanding Teen pageant.

Ryleigh Jackson of Germantown was crowned Miss Maryland's Outstanding Teen on June 24, 2022 at the Maryland Theater in Hagerstown, Maryland. She competed for the title of Miss America's Outstanding Teen 2023 at the Hyatt Regency Dallas in Dallas, Texas on August 12, 2022.

Results summary 
The results of Miss Maryland's Outstanding Teen as they participated in the national Miss America's Outstanding Teen competition. The year in parentheses indicates the year of the Miss America's Outstanding Teen competition the award/placement was garnered.

Placements 

 1st runners-up: Kate Wills (2022)
2nd runners-up: Chloe Wildman (2018)
 3rd runners-up: Joanna Guy (2009)
 Top 10: Kennedy Taylor (2013)

Awards

Preliminary awards 
 Preliminary Lifestyle & Fitness: Joanna Guy (2009)

Other awards 
 America's Choice: Kate Wills (2022)
Outstanding Achievement in Academic Life: Joanna Guy (2009), Chloe Wildman (2018)
Spirit of America Award: Kate Wills (2022)
 Teens in Action Award Winners: Sabrina Frost (2014)
 Teens in Action Award Finalists: Chloe Wildman (2018)

Winners

References

External links
 Official website

Maryland
Maryland culture
Women in Maryland
Annual events in Maryland